Epiphthora chionocephala is a moth of the family Gelechiidae. It was described by Oswald Bertram Lower in 1901. It is found in Australia, where it has been recorded from New South Wales.

The forewings are white, irrorated (sprinkled) with dark fuscous and with an undefined fascia at one-fourth, cloudy dorsal spots before and beyond the middle, and a nearly clear white narrow subapical fascia dilated on the costa. There are undefined spots of dark fuscous suffusion on the submedian fold before the anterior fascia and between the dorsal spots, and before and beyond the subapical fascia. The hindwings are grey.

References

Moths described in 1901
Epiphthora